John Kee (August 22, 1874 – May 8, 1951) was an American politician. A member of the Democratic Party, he served in the United States House of Representatives from 1933 until his death in Washington, D.C. in 1951.

Biography
He was born in Glenville, West Virginia. He attended Glenville State Normal School and West Virginia University, where he was a member of Phi Sigma Kappa, and was admitted to the bar in 1897. Kee was a member of the West Virginia Senate 1923–1927 He was elected as a Democrat to the United States House of Representatives from West Virginia and served from March 4, 1933 until his death, serving the Fifth Congressional District of West Virginia in the 73rd through the 82nd U.S. Congress. He was chairman of the House Committee on Foreign Affairs in the Eighty-first and Eighty-second Congresses.

A confidential 1943 analysis of the House Foreign Affairs Committee by Isaiah Berlin for the British Foreign Office stated that

Kee died of a heart attack in Washington, D.C. on May 8, 1951. His wife, Elizabeth Kee, succeeded him as U.S. Representative after winning a special election to replace him. She served until 1965 when she was succeeded by their son, James Kee, who served until 1973 when the 5th district was abolished.

See also
United States congressional delegations from West Virginia
List of United States Congress members who died in office (1950–99)

References

Sources

 John Kee at The Political Graveyard
 Memorial services held in the House of Representatives together with remarks presented in eulogy of John Kee, late a representative from West Virginia

External links 
 

1874 births
1951 deaths
Democratic Party West Virginia state senators
People from Glenville, West Virginia
People from Bluefield, West Virginia
19th-century American Episcopalians
20th-century American Episcopalians
West Virginia lawyers
West Virginia University alumni
Glenville State College alumni
Democratic Party members of the United States House of Representatives from West Virginia